Kaptaan is a 2016 Indian Punjabi-language action/courtroom drama film directed by Mandeep Kumar and  starring Gippy Grewal, Monica Gill, Karishma Kotak. The release date of the film is 20 May 2016.

Cast
Gippy Grewal as Advocate Kaptaan Singh Grewal 
 Monica Gill as Preeti
 Karishma Kotak as Sam
 Pankaj Dheer as  Dhillon
 Kanwaljit Singh as Judge

Track list

Reception

Critical response
IANS and The Tribune reviewed the film.

References

External links
Official youtube channel

2016 films
Punjabi-language Indian films
2010s Punjabi-language films
Films scored by Jaidev Kumar
Films scored by B Praak
Films scored by DJ Flow
UTV Motion Pictures films